CCHR may refer to:

 Calendar of the Charter Rolls (CChR), book series translating and summarising these medieval documents
 Cambodian Center for Human Rights, a non-governmental organization based in Phnom Penh, Cambodia
 Citizens Commission on Human Rights, an anti-psychiatry organization affiliated with Scientology
 Civic Committee for Human Rights, a nongovernmental nonprofit organization in Croatia

See also 
 Carl Christensen (botanist) (1872–1942) (standard author abbreviation C.Chr.), Danish systematic botanist
 National Center for Civil and Human Rights (NCCHR), a proposed archives, museum, and cultural and research center in Atlanta, Georgia, United States